Dzhungarocosa is a genus of Kazakh wolf spiders first described by A. A. Fomichev & Yuri M. Marusik in 2017.  it contains only three species.

References

External links

Araneomorphae genera
Lycosidae